Beppo is a monkey superhero appearing in American comic books published by DC Comics, primarily those featuring Superman.

Publication history 
Created by Otto Binder and George Papp, he first appeared in Superboy #76 (October 1959). He made sixteen appearances in Superman comics during the Silver Age of Comic Books.

Fictional character biography
Despite his resemblance to an Earth monkey, due to convergent evolution producing analogous species to fill similar ecological niches, Beppo is from the planet Krypton. He was originally one of Jor-El's test animals. Luckily for him, Beppo decided to stow away aboard baby Kal-El's rocket to Earth and was thus saved from its destruction. Upon landing, Beppo hopped out unseen and went off on his own for some months. Beppo lived in a jungle and handled himself quite well, since as a Kryptonian monkey he had the usual array of super-powers.

One day Beppo, using his telescopic vision, spotted Kal-El, now a toddler living in Smallville with the Kents. Beppo quickly flew to Smallville and, being a monkey, secretly caused all sorts of havoc. Ma and Pa Kent initially blamed baby Clark for Beppo's super-powered monkeyshines, but they soon discovered the truth. The Kents fretted that Clark's secret might be exposed by the super-antics of the Simian of Steel but, as it turned out, their worry was needless. It wasn't long before Beppo accidentally set off some 4th of July fireworks stored in the Kent garage. The explosions spooked Beppo, who took off into space. The panicked Beppo kept on going when he saw a passing comet, which he thought was more fireworks chasing him. When Beppo failed to return, the Kents presumed he'd gotten lost out there somewhere. Beppo's origin is related in "The Super-Monkey from Krypton!", the cover story in Superboy #76 (October 1959). At the end of the story, which is told in flashback by teenaged Clark, the reader is informed that Beppo made his way back to Earth before too long.

Many years later, Beppo encountered Supergirl, who introduced him to Krypto the Superdog and Streaky the Supercat. Beppo went on to join the Legion of Super-Pets.

Beppo was retconned out of existence following the Crisis on Infinite Earths limited series. He was briefly returned to existence by the Psycho-Pirate during the 2005-06 storyline Infinite Crisis, and then appeared in Final Crisis: Legion of 3 Worlds #5.

Powers, abilities, and equipment
Beppo possessed the same powers and abilities as a Kryptonian adult, although his physical abilities were proportionate to his smaller size and species.

Other versions
 Beppo is one of the animals in Superman's artificial reality farm in Kingdom Come #1 (May 1996). 
 He also appears in the out-of-continuity Tiny Titans, alongside Streaky the Super-Cat, as Supergirl's pet.
 In the canon of Smallville, a Christopher James Beppo is a reporter investigating LuthorCorp.

In other media
 Beppo is referenced in the Superman: The Animated Series episode "Monkey Fun" as the name of Lois Lane's childhood toy, a stuffed monkey that played "Pop Goes the Weasel". The toy was also the favorite of Titano, a test chimp used by the space program. When Titano returns to Earth and grows to gargantuan proportions, he can only be calmed down by the sound of Beppo's song ("Pop Goes the Weasel"). 
 A Beppo toy appeared in the Batman Beyond episode "Rats".
 While Beppo does not appear, a Smallville Gazette editor named Chrissy Beppo appears on Superman and Lois played by Sofia Hasmik.

See also
 List of fictional primates
 List of fictional primates in comics

References

External links
Supermanica: Beppo
Beppo the Super-Monkey at the Comic Book Gorillarama

1959 comics debuts
Animal superheroes
Characters created by Otto Binder
Characters created by George Papp
Comics about animals
Comics about monkeys
Comics characters introduced in 1959
DC Comics characters who can move at superhuman speeds
DC Comics characters with accelerated healing
DC Comics characters with superhuman senses
DC Comics characters with superhuman strength
DC Comics extraterrestrial superheroes
DC Comics male superheroes
DC Comics animals
Fictional characters with superhuman durability or invulnerability
Fictional characters with slowed ageing
Fictional characters with X-ray vision
Fictional characters with nuclear or radiation abilities
Fictional characters with air or wind abilities
Fictional characters with ice or cold abilities
Fictional characters with absorption or parasitic abilities
Fictional characters with energy-manipulation abilities
Fictional characters with fire or heat abilities
Fictional monkeys
Kryptonians
Superman characters
Superboy
Legion of Super-Pets